Trentham railway station was built by the North Staffordshire Railway (NSR) as part of the main line south from Stoke towards Stafford and served the village of Trentham, Staffordshire, England.

The original station opened along with the first section of the Stafford to Manchester Line in 1848.  As the station was the closest to Trentham Hall, at the time the principal residence of the Dukes of Sutherland, new station buildings were constructed in 1851 to a design by Charles Barry.

Trentham Junction
In 1910 the NSR opened the Trentham Park branch to serve Trentham Gardens.  This new line joined the main line slightly to the north of Trentham station and, to enable passengers travelling to/from stations south of Trentham to exchange to the branch, a new single platform station called Trentham Junction was opened.  Reached from Trentham station by a short walk, Trentham Junction was always operated as part of Trentham station and never featured separately in public timetables.

Closure
The Trentham Branch line closed to regular passenger traffic in 1927 but continued in use for excursion traffic until 1957.  The branch and the Trentham Junction platform finally closed on 1 October 1957.  The main Trentham station closed in the Beeching cuts of 1964.

References

Further reading

 
 

Disused railway stations in Stoke-on-Trent
Railway stations in Great Britain closed in 1964
Railway stations in Great Britain opened in 1848
Former North Staffordshire Railway stations
Beeching closures in England